Holy Hill may refer to:

in England
  Holy Hill, a monastery in England

in Ireland
 The Holy Hill Hermitage in Ireland

in the United States
 Holy Hill National Shrine of Mary, Help of Christians, Erin, Wisconsin, also known as Holy Hill and listed as that on the National Register of Historic Places
 Holy Hill, a hill in Berkeley, California which is the site of a number of seminaries and the library of the Graduate Theological Union